Il falegname di Livonia, o Pietro il grande, czar delle Russie (The Livonian Carpenter, or Peter the Great, Tsar of the Russias) is an 1819 opera buffa in two acts with music by Gaetano Donizetti set to a libretto by Gherardo Bevilacqua-Aldobrandini. The libretto was based in part on Felice Romani's libretto for Giovanni Pacini's opera Il falegname di Livonia, which had just been presented at La Scala in Milan on 12 April 1819. Another source was Alexandre Duval's comedy Le menuisier de Livonie, ou Les illustres voyageurs (1805).

Donizetti's Il falegname di Livonia was premiered on 26 December 1819 at the opening of the 1819/1820 Carnival season at the Teatro San Samuele in Venice. It was the fourth of Donizetti’s operas to be performed during his lifetime and the first to achieve "more than one production". It had about seven stagings until 1827, when its last known performance in the 19th century took place.

Performance history

In 2004, the opera was presented by the Festival della Valle d'Itria in Martina Franca; those performances were recorded.

Roles

Synopsis

Time: Late 17th century
Place: The Baltic State of Livonia (now Latvia and Estonia) in an unnamed town under Russian rule.

Act 1
Carlo, a carpenter, is in love with the orphan Annetta. He claims to be of noble origin and shows that he has a bit of a temper when the tsar and his wife, Catherine, arrive, both travelling incognito. They are looking for the tsarina’s lost brother, and have reason to suspect that it might be Carlo. The tsar asks the hotelier, Madame Fritz, about this carpenter. When Carlo enters, he does not know who the strangers are and he is rather insolent. An argument ensues, with Peter threatening Carlo with dire consequences. The town magistrate, Ser Cuccupis, also gets into an argument with Peter. This magistrate has pretensions of grandeur and goes so far as to threaten him with his friend, the tsar. Peter decides to pull rank on the magistrate, and tells him that he is Menshikov, a high officer of the tsar. The magistrate has Carlo imprisoned, and he is about to be convicted when Madame Fritz runs in with some documents proving that he is Catherine’s brother.

Act 2
When Carlo becomes aware that he is the tsar's brother-in-law, he introduces Annetta to the imperial couple. Again, not knowing the true identity of the couple, he warns them that the tsar must never see her because she is the daughter of the traitor hetman Ivan Mazepa. When told that Mazepa is dead, the false Menshikov pardons the girl. Then the captain of the troops tells the magistrate that Menshikov is actually the tsar. Hoping that this would be an opportunity to advance himself, the magistrate tries to intervene, but since the tsar has already recognized him for what he is, he is fired from his position of authority and is ordered to pay a fine. Peter, Catherine, Carlo and Annetta leave happily for St Petersburg.

Recordings

Note: The act 2 sextet is included in A Hundred Years of Italian Opera, 1810–1820 (Opera Rara; Cat: ORCH103).

References
Notes

Cited sources
 Osborne, Charles (1994). The Bel Canto Operas of Rossini, Donizetti, and Bellini. Portland, Oregon: Amadeus Press. .

Further reading
Allitt, John Stewart (1991), Donizetti: in the light of Romanticism and the teaching of Johann Simon Mayr, Shaftesbury: Element Books, Ltd (UK); Rockport, MA: Element, Inc.(USA)
 Ashbrook, William (1982), Donizetti and His Operas. Cambridge University Press., .
Ashbrook, William; John Black; Julian Budden (1998), "Donizetti, (Domenico) Gaetano (Maria)", in Stanley Sadie (Ed.), The New Grove Dictionary of Opera, vol. 1, pp. 1206–1221. London: MacMillan Publishers, Inc.  
Ashbrook, William and Sarah Hibberd (2001), in Holden, Amanda (Ed.), The New Penguin Opera Guide, New York: Penguin Putnam. . pp. 224–247.
Loewenberg, Alfred (1970). Annals of Opera, 1597–1940, 2nd edition. Rowman and Littlefield
Sadie, Stanley, (ed.); John Tyrrell (exec. ed.) (2001), The New Grove Dictionary of Music and Musicians. London: Macmillan.  (hardcover).  (eBook).
Weinstock, Herbert (1963), Donizetti and the World of Opera in Italy, Paris, and Vienna in the First Half of the Nineteenth Century, New York: Pantheon Books.

External links
 Donizetti Society (London) website
 Libretto (Italian) 1
 Libretto (Italian) 2 
 Il Falegname di Livonia, ossia Pietro Il Grande, Russian premiere presented by the St Petersburg Chamber Opera Company.
 Kaufman, Tom, "Donizetti: Pietro il Grande, on operatoday.com, 13 Sep 2005. (Review of recording)

Operas by Gaetano Donizetti
Italian-language operas
Operas
1819 operas
Cultural depictions of Peter the Great
Operas set in Europe
Operas set in the 17th century